The National Order of Vietnam was a combined military-civilian decoration of South Vietnam and was considered the highest honor that could be bestowed upon an individual by the Republic of Vietnam government.

The decoration was created in 1950 and was awarded to any person who performed "grandiose works, remarkable deeds, exhibited bravery, or for those who have honored and served the country by lofty virtues and outstanding knowledge."

The National Order was modeled after the French National Order of the Legion of Honour, and as such it was issued in five degrees:

Grand Cross - wore the badge of the Order on a sash on the right shoulder, plus the star of the Order on the right stomach OR just the star of the Order on the left stomach;
Grand Officer - wore the star of the Order on the right stomach;
Commander - wore the badge on a necklet;
Officer - wore the badge on a ribbon with rosette on the left chest;
Knight - wore the badge on a ribbon on the left chest.

Both the badge and the star had the same design, as shown in the top right of this page. The ribbon was red with yellow borders. It was, in fact, the ribbon of the former Order of the Dragon of Annam when awarded by the Emperor of Annam himself (when awarded by the French Government the ribbon was green with orange borders).

During the Vietnam War, the National Order of Vietnam was bestowed on several members of the United States military, most of whom were senior military and political advisors to the South Vietnamese government. The decoration could also be awarded posthumously.

Since the National Order of Vietnam was both a civil and a military decoration, it was displayed above all other awards when worn on a military uniform. A purely military equivalent of the decoration was the Vietnam Military Merit Medal, awarded only to members of the military.

Notable recipients
Alfredo M. Santos (Philippines)
Emperor Haile Selassie of Ethiopia
Cao Văn Viên (1921–2008) General, Army of the Republic of Vietnam, and Commander, III Corps.
Alexander Haig (1924–2010)
Dr Hồ Văn Nhựt (1905–1986), Founder of the Southern Red Cross of Vietnam
J. M. Abdul Aziz (1905–1958), Saigon business leader, recipient Legion d'Honneur, French Red Cross
Thanom Kittikachorn
Sharon Ann Lane (1943-1969), U.S. Army Nurse
Rembrandt C. Robinson (1924–1972), Commander Cruiser/Destroyer Group, U.S. Seventh Fleet, Vietnam

See also
Orders, decorations, and medals of South Vietnam
Legion of Honour

References

External links
 Images of Orders, Decorations, and Medals of the Republic of Vietnam 
Military Orders, Decorations, and Medals of the Republic of Vietnam

Orders, decorations, and medals of Vietnam